Peligrosamente Juntos is the eighth album released by Spanish rock band Hombres G, released in 2002. A second version was released in 2004.

Track listing

Personnel 

 David Summers – vocals, bass
 Rafa Gutiérrez – guitar
 Daniel Mezquita – guitar
 Javier Molina – drums

References

External links
 Official website
 Discography

Hombres G albums
2002 compilation albums